Chermside was the name of two incarnations of an electoral district of the Legislative Assembly in the Australian state of Queensland.

Both districts were based in the north-eastern suburbs of Brisbane and named for the suburb of Chermside. The first existed from 1950 to 1960 and the second from 1992 to 2001.

Members for Chermside

Election results

See also
 Electoral districts of Queensland
 Members of the Queensland Legislative Assembly by year
 :Category:Members of the Queensland Legislative Assembly by name

References

Former electoral districts of Queensland